is the northernmost ward of the city of Sendai, in Miyagi Prefecture, Japan. ,  the ward had a population of 215,048 and a population density of 1470 persons per km2 in 90,336 households. Izumi-ku is the twelfth-largest ward in Japan in terms of area, and third-largest in Sendai (behind Aoba-ku and Taihaku-ku). Formerly the independent city of Izumi, the population of the area expanded extremely rapidly from the mid-1970s onwards as a bedroom community for central Sendai. In 1988, the city of Izumi was annexed by Sendai.

Geography
Izumi-ku is located inland, forming the northern portion of Sendai metropolis. The area is mountainous to the west, with Izumigatake as the highest point at 1172 meters.

Neighboring municipalities
Miyagi Prefecture
Aoba-ku, Sendai
Miyagino-ku, Sendai
Tomiya
Taiwa

History
The area of present-day Izumi-ku was part of ancient Mutsu Province, and has been settled since at least the Japanese Paleolithic period. The area was inhabited by the Emishi people, and came under the control of the Yamato dynasty during the late Nara period. During the Heian period, it was controlled by the Abe clan, followed by the Northern Fujiwara clan of Hiraizumi. During the Sengoku period, the area was dominated by various samurai clans before coming under the control of the Date clan during the Edo period, who ruled Sendai Domain under the Tokugawa shogunate. With the establishment of the post-Meiji restoration municipalities system, the area was organised into the villages of Fukuoka, Nishi-Tanaka, Nenoshiroishi, Hōzawa, Sanezawa, Ogaku, Nanakita, Ichinazaka, Matsumori, Furuuchi, Kamiyagari, No, Aramaki and Kitane within Miyagi District of Miyagi Prefecture prior to April 1, 1889

Municipal timeline
 April 1, 1889 - In Miyagi District, the villages of Izumidake (merger of the villages of Fukuoka, Nishi-Tanaka, Nenoshiroishi, Hōzawa, Sanezawa and Ogaku) and Nanakita (merger of the villages of Nanakita, Ichinazaka, Matsumori, Furuuchi, Kamiyagari, No, Aramaki and Kitane) were established.
 September 7, 1897 - Izumidake was renamed to Nenoshiroishi.
 April 1, 1931 - A portion of Nanakita (Aramaki and Kitane) was annexed by Sendai (specifically now part of Aoba-ku).
 April 10, 1955 - The remaining portion of Nanakita and Nenoshiroishi were combined to create the village of Izumi.
 August 1, 1957 - The village of Izumi was elevated to town status. (see Municipalities of Japan)
 November 1, 1971 - The town of Izumi was elevated to a city status.
 March 1, 1988 - Izumi was annexed to Sendai
 April 1, 1989 - When Sendai was designated as a city by the national government, Izumi-ku was formed as one of the five wards of the city.

Economy
Although Izumi-ku is mostly a residential area, it is also home to several college campuses; and companies such as Alps, Freescale Semiconductor, and Toppan have a large presence in the Izumi Parktown Industrial Park.

Education

Colleges and universities
Tohoku Gakuin University - Izumi campus
Sendai Shirayuri Women's College
Tohoku Seikatsu Bunka College
Seiwa Gakuen College

Primary and secondary schools
Izumi-ku has 29 public elementary schools and 17 public junior high schools operated by the city government. The ward also has three public high schools operated by the Miyagi Prefectural Board of Education. The Tohoku International School and Sendai Shirayuri Gakuen Junior High School and High School (a private school) are also located in the ward.

Transportation

Railway
Sendai Subway - Nanboku Line
 -  -

Highway
  – (Izumi Interchange; Izumi Parking Area (ETC exit gate))

Notable buildings
 Yurtec Stadium Sendai (Sendai Stadium)
 Shellcom Sendai

References

External links

  

Wards of Sendai